Colonia (released in the UK as The Colony) is a 2015 historical thriller film directed by Florian Gallenberger, produced by Benjamin Herrmann, written by Torsten Wenzel and Gallenberger, and starring Emma Watson, Daniel Brühl, and Michael Nyqvist. The film is set against the backdrop of the 1973 Chilean military coup and the Colonia Dignidad, a notorious cult in the South of Chile, led by German lay preacher Paul Schäfer. Colonia is an international co-production of companies in the UK, Germany, Luxembourg, and France.

Principal photography began on 2 October 2014 in Luxembourg; filming also took place in Germany and Argentina. Colonia held its world premiere at the 2015 Toronto International Film Festival in the Special Presentations section. The film was released in Germany on 18 February 2016, in the United Kingdom on 1 July 2016, and in France on 20 July 2016.

Plot
In 1973, Lena is a strong, independent and adventurous Lufthansa stewardess and is in relationship with Daniel, a West German journalist and activist living in Chile. Upon arrival in Santiago, she reunites with him and they spend their days in the capital peacefully.

One day, the two become entangled in a Chilean military coup at a time when supporters of deposed President Salvador Allende are getting rounded up by the military under General Augusto Pinochet. When Daniel is abducted by Pinochet's secret police DINA, Lena tries to find and save him. The pursuit leads her to  "Colonia Dignidad", an isolated secret organisation living in a sealed-off rural farmland and enclave near the Andes mountains. The organisation presents itself as a charitable mission run by Paul Schäfer, a former Wehrmacht colonel and army medic who evaded capture and trial following World War II by disguising himself as a Lutheran pastor and lay minister, later fleeing to Chile to build the organisation.

Lena joins the organisation to rescue Daniel, only to learn it is a cult that combines Baptist-style tenets, punitive agrarian lifestyles, Nazism, and aggressive anti-Communism, from which no one has ever escaped. She witnesses Doro, a fellow member, get brutally beaten and humiliated at the men's section after it is revealed that she wanted to get married to another cult member. Lena skinny dips in a nearby pond in order to brought over to the men's section for the same punishments so that she can find Daniel. After a power outage, she later finds him; he has acted mentally disabled so he would be overlooked. When they reunite, the couple discover the organisation is also an illegal operations centre for DINA, who also use it as a political prison, trafficking ring, and torture venue for dissidents of Pinochet.

With the help of a pregnant nurse named Ursel, Lena and Daniel attempt to escape from Colonia Dignidad. During the escape, they are discovered and Ursel is killed but Lena and Daniel escape to the West German embassy. Staff from the embassy betray them but they exit the country by air, with incriminating photographic evidence against Colonia Dignidad.

Cast
 Emma Watson as Lena, a young flight attendant working for the German airline Lufthansa who joins the cult Colonia Dignidad to rescue her boyfriend Daniel.
 Daniel Brühl as Daniel, Lena's boyfriend, a West German activist working in Chile as a journalist who is kidnapped by General Augusto Pinochet's secret police DINA.
 Michael Nyqvist as Paul Schäfer, the leader of Colonia Dignidad.
 Richenda Carey as Gisela
 Vicky Krieps as Ursel
 Jeanne Werner as Doro
 César Bordón as Manuel Contreras
 Marcelo Vilaro as Augusto Pinochet
 August Zirner as German Ambassador
 Martin Wuttke as Niels Biedermann
 Julian Ovenden as Roman Breuer
 Nicolás Barsoff as Jorge

Production
On 29 September 2014, it was announced that Emma Watson and Daniel Brühl would star as a couple in the upcoming film which is based on a real historical background, directed by Florian Gallenberger who co-wrote the script with Torsten Wenzel. Benjamin Herrmann would be producing the film through Majestic Filmproduktion, and Nicolas Steil would co-produce through Iris Productions. Kolja Brandt would be director of photography, and Hansjörg Weißbrich would be the film editor. On 27 October, Michael Nyqvist joined the film to star as Paul Schäfer.

Principal photography began on 2 October 2014 in Luxembourg, where it was shot in Haut Martelange near to Rambrouch on the Luxembourg-Belgium border. Filming in Luxembourg lasted through the end of October, and then the production moved to Germany for further shooting in Munich and Berlin. It was also shot in Buenos Aires until early 2015.

Release
Colonia premiered at the 2015 Toronto International Film Festival on 13 September 2015. Shortly after, Screen Media Films acquired U.S distribution rights to the film. The film also screened at the Berlin International Film Festival on 12 February 2016. The film was released in Germany on 18 February 2016 by Majestic Filmverleih, in the United Kingdom on 1 July 2016 by Signature Entertainment. and in France on 20 July 2016 by Rezo Films. The film was released to a limited run in the United States and Canada on 15 April 2016.

Reception

Box office
Colonia grossed $15,709 in the United States and Canada and $3.6 million in other countries, giving a worldwide total of $3.62 million.
In Germany, Colonia grossed $608,337 in its opening weekend. After seven weeks, the film grossed a total of $1.9 million. In the United Kingdom, the film was released in three cinemas nationwide, as part of a distribution deal geared towards video-on-demand. The film grossed just $61 (£47) in its opening weekend.

Critical response
On review aggregation website Rotten Tomatoes the film has a rating of 26% based on 47 reviews, with an average rating of 4.23/10.

Accolades
Colonia received 5 nominations from the German Film Awards, including Best Supporting Actor.

{| class="wikitable sortable" style="width: 99%;"
|-
! scope="col"| Year
! scope="col"| Award
! scope="col"| Category
! scope="col"| Recipients
! scope="col"| Result
! scope="col" class="unsortable"| 
|-
|rowspan="9"| 2016
| Bavarian Film Awards
| Best Production
| 
| 
| style="text-align:center;"|
|-
|rowspan="5"| German Film Awards
| Best Editing
| Hansjörg Weißbrich
| 
|rowspan="5" style="text-align:center;"|
|-
| Best Production Design
| Bernd Lepel 
| 
|-
| Best Costume Design
| Nicole Fischnaller 
| 
|-
| Best Sound
| 
| 
|-
| Best Performance by an Actor in a Supporting Role
| Michael Nyqvist
| 
|-
| Golden Trailer Awards
| Best Foreign Thriller Trailer
| 
| 
| style="text-align:center;"|
|-
|rowspan="2"| Women Film Critics Circle Awards
| Adrienne Shelly Award
| Colonia
| 
|rowspan="2" style="text-align:center;"|
|-
| Best Female Action Hero
| Emma Watson
| 
|-
| 2017
| Jupiter Awards
| Best International Actress
| Emma Watson
| 
| style="text-align:center;"|
|-

References

External links
 
 
 
 
 

2015 films
Anti-Chilean sentiment
English-language German films
English-language Luxembourgian films
English-language French films
2010s Spanish-language films
2010s historical films
2010s romantic thriller films
2015 romantic drama films
German romantic drama films
German thriller drama films
German historical films
German romantic thriller films
Luxembourgian drama films
French romantic drama films
French historical films
French romantic thriller films
French political films
French thriller drama films
Films about the Chilean military dictatorship
Films set in 1973
Films set in Chile
Films shot in Argentina
Films shot in Bavaria
Films shot in Berlin
Films shot in Buenos Aires
Films shot in Luxembourg
2010s political thriller films
2015 thriller drama films
2010s historical romance films
Films scored by Fernando Velázquez
German historical romance films
American romantic drama films
Colonia Dignidad
Films about Nazi fugitives in South America
Films about coups d'état
Films about cults
2010s English-language films
2010s American films
2010s French films
2010s German films